Felix Ludwig Graf von Bothmer (10 December 1852 – 18 March 1937) was a German general from Bavaria. He notably served in the Brusilov offensive of World War I.

Military Career and After
In 1871 Bothmer joined the Bavarian Army. He spent most of the following forty years serving in the Bavarian War Ministry or on the Royal Bavarian Army General Staff, with stints of line duty and three years in Berlin with the Prussian General Staff. Rising through the ranks; in 1910 he was promoted to General der Infanterie. Before World War I Bothmer fractured a leg which rendered him unfit for field duty, resulting in him having to wait for a command until December. On 30 November 1914 he was appointed to command the 6th Bavarian Reserve Division at Ypres.

On 22 March 1915 he was given the command of Corps Bothmer, a unit raised to help defend the passes of the Carpathian Mountains against Russian attacks that directly threatened Hungary. He won the Battle of Zwinin which took place from 5 February – 9 April 1915, and was thus in the right place to take part in the great German advance after the breakthrough during the Gorlice–Tarnów Offensive in May 1915.

After 6 July 1915, Hans Ritter von Hemmer was his Chief of General Staff. On 7 July, he was awarded the Pour le Mérite for outstanding leadership and distinguished military planning and successful operations during the battles of Dniester, Gnila-Lipa, and Zlota-Lipa. A day later Bothmer succeeded Alexander von Linsingen as commander of the South Army, which consisted of German and Austrian units. He was awarded the oak leaves to his Pour le Merite on 25 July 1917 for his actions during the battle around the city of Brzezany during the German summer offensive on the eastern front, as well as for his leadership and during the battle at the bridgehead at Zbrucz. He also received the Grand Cross of the Bavarian Military Order of Max Joseph.

His units stood firm against the Brusilov Offensive of June 1916. In 1917, he was appointed to command the 19th Army in Lorraine. He remained there until 8 November 1918, while to the north the German front crumbled. Bothmer retired from the army in November 1918. Bothmer’s last job in the army, again along with von Hemmer, was as an adviser for the Bavarian Ministry for Military Affairs from November to December 1918, mostly overseeing the demobilization of the soon-to-be-disbanded Bavarian Army.

After the war, he lived in Munich. After the Beer Hall Putsch, Bothmer said during the trials of Adolf Hitler that the putsch was well prepared.

Count Bothmer died in Munich on 18 March 1937 and, contrary to his family's wishes, Adolf Hitler's government ordered a state funeral. He was eulogized by Prince Rupprecht of Bavaria.

Family
Bothmer's father was an army general and belonged to the German nobility.  Felix Graf von Bothmer married Auguste Baldinger on 22 July 1882.  They had 2 daughters together.

Military ranks
Leutnant: 28 November 1871
Oberleutnant: 23 November 1882
Hauptmann: 31 October 1888
Major: 22 September 1893
Oberstleutnant: 17 March 1897
Oberst: 21 July 1900
Generalmajor: 18 May 1903
Generalleutnant: 15 September 1905
General der Infanterie: 4 May 1910
Generaloberst: 9 April 1918

Decorations and Honours 

Bavaria

 Military Order of Max Joseph, Knight's Cross (1915), Commander's Cross (1915) and Grand Cross (1916)
 Military Merit Order, 1st Class, Swords to 1st Class and Grand Cross with Swords
 Service Decoration, 1st Class
 Ludwigsorden, Honor Cross
 Jubilee Medal
 Merit Order of St. Michael, 1st Class

Prussia

 Order of the Red Eagle, 1st Class
 Pour le Mérite with Oakleaves
 1914 Iron Cross 1st Class
 1914 Iron Cross 2nd Class
 War Commemorative Medal of 1870/71
 Centenary Medal
 Order of the Crown
 The Honour Cross of the World War 1914/1918 (German Award)

Other German states

 Anhalt: Friedrich Cross
 Bremen: Hanseatic Cross
 Brunswick: House Order of Henry the Lion, Grand Cross
 Hesse-Darmstadt: Order of Philip the Magnanimous, Grand Cross with Crown
 Hohenzollern: Princely House Order of Hohenzollern, 1st Class with Swords
 Lübeck: Hanseatic Cross
 Saxony: Albert Order, Grand Cross and Star and Swords to Grand Cross
 Saxony: Military Order of St. Henry, Knight's Cross and Commander's Cross
 Württemberg: Order of the Württemberg Crown, Grand Cross

Other countries

 Austria-Hungary: Imperial Austrian Order of Leopold, Grand Cross with War Decoration
 Austria-Hungary: Imperial Austrian Order of the Iron Crown, Knight 1st Class with War Decoration
 Austria-Hungary: Military Merit Cross, 1st Class with War Decoration
 Austria-Hungary: Large Military Merit Medal
 Austria-Hungary: Red Cross Decoration 1st Class with War Decoration
 Denmark: Order of the Dannebrog, Knight
 Japan: Order of the Sacred Treasure, Grand Officer's Cross
 Spain: Grand Cross of the Order of Military Merit (Spain)
 Ottoman Empire: Imtiaz Medal in Gold with Swords
 Ottoman Empire: Liakat Medal in Gold with Swords
 Ottoman Empire: Turkish War Medal (so-called "Gallipoli Star")
 Ottoman Empire: Order of Medjidie, 1st Class with Swords

The orders above which were from Allied nations were awarded prior to World War I.

References

External links
 Felix Graf von Bothmer at Austrian Commanders

Additional Reading
 Konrad Krafft von Dellmensingen, Friedrichfranz Feeser, "Das Bayernbuch vom Weltkriege 1914-1918", I. Band, Chr. Belser AG, Verlagsbuchhandlung, Stuttgart 1930
 Günter Wegner, Deutschlands Heere bis 1918, Band 10, Bayern, Biblio Verlag, Osnabrück, 1984
 Rudolf v. Kramer, Otto Freiherr von Waldenfels, Der königlich bayerische Militär-Max-Joseph-Orden, Selbstverlag des k. b. Militär-Max-Joseph-Ordens, München 1966

1852 births
1937 deaths
Military personnel from Munich
People from the Kingdom of Bavaria
Bavarian generals
German Army generals of World War I
Recipients of the Pour le Mérite (military class)
Grand Crosses of the Military Order of Max Joseph
Grand Crosses of the Military Merit Order (Bavaria)
Recipients of the Iron Cross (1914), 1st class
Recipients of the Hanseatic Cross (Lübeck)
Recipients of the Hanseatic Cross (Bremen)
Counts of Germany
Recipients of the Order of the Sacred Treasure
Recipients of the Gold Imtiyaz Medal
Recipients of the Gold Liakat Medal
Recipients of the Order of the Medjidie, 1st class
Knights of the Order of the Dannebrog
Grand Crosses of Military Merit